Aortic unfolding is an abnormality visible on a chest X-ray, that shows widening of the mediastinum which may mimic the appearance of a thoracic aortic aneurysm. 

With aging, the ascending portion of the thoracic aorta increases in length by approximately 12% per decade, whereas the diameter increases by just 3% per decade. This elongation causes the ascending aorta to appear as a vertical shadow on the left heart border. Unfolding is often associated with aortic calcification which implies aortic degeneration and hypertension.  Aortic unfolding, though not serious, should be differentiated from the more severe dissection of the aorta.

References

Radiologic signs